John Herman Townend (6 September 1903 – 2 August 1926) was a British rower. He competed in the men's coxed four event at the 1924 Summer Olympics. He was killed when he fell from the top of an omnibus.

References

External links
 

1903 births
1926 deaths
British male rowers
Olympic rowers of Great Britain
Rowers at the 1924 Summer Olympics
Place of birth missing
Sportspeople from Chertsey
Road incident deaths in England
Accidental deaths from falls